Sri Kothanda Ramaswamy Temple ( Tamil:ஸ்ரீ கோதண்ட இராமசாமி கோவில்) is located in Kottar, Kanyakumari district in the Indian state of  Tamil Nadu. This is a shrine dedicated to the Hindu deity Rama. Located at a distance of about 2 km from district headquarters Nagercoil.The temple has the deities of Rama, Sita, Lakshmana & Hanuman. It is easily accessible from Nagercoil Railway Station.

History 
The temple is estimated to have been constructed about 150 years ago. Rama, the main idol, is depicted as having a bow (Kothandam), and hence the name Kothandaramaswamy for the idol. The temple is constructed by the Saurashtrians who had come from southern Gujarat to South India in 14th century AD. Inside the temple at the courtyard, the ten incarnations (avatars) of Lord Vishnu is portrayed. There is a pond and a Marriage Hall (Sourashtra Samuthaya Vaasippusaalai) belongs to the temple. The former one is at the rear side of the temple and the latter is located next to the temple.

Importance 
Sri Kothanda Ramaswamy Temple is well-known for the 11 days Rama Navami festival during the month of April. Saurashtrians takes the responsibility for the 11 days function. During the festival time, temple priest dress up the idol of Lord Rama with an incarnation each day. On the 11th day festival, the God (Urchava moorthy, உற்சவமூர்த்தி) is brought to the street for pooja. And also, every saturday a special Pooja and Bajan by Saurashtrian bagavathars will takes place.

Consecration 
The consecration of the temple held on 1 July 2018 (Sunday).

Transport 
Nearby Railway station : Nagercoil Railway Station,
Nearby Bus stand       : Anna Bus stand, Nagercoil.

Temple timings 
Morning : 06:00 hrs to 08:30 hrs,
Evening : 18:00 hrs to 20:30 hrs

References 

Rama temples
Hindu temples in Kanyakumari district